Glenn Howard (born 1962) is a Canadian curler.

Glenn Howard may also refer to:

Glenn L. Howard (1939–2012), Democratic member of the Indiana Senate
Glenn Howard (footballer) (born 1962), Australian rules footballer
Glenn Howard (athlete) (born 1976), New Zealand high jumper
Glenn Howard (Gene Barry), fictional character from The Name of the Game

See also 

Howard Glenn (1934–1960), American gridiron football player